Mesoclemmys gibba, known as the toadhead turtle or gibba turtle, is a small side necked turtle found in a wide area of South America, in Peru, Ecuador, Colombia, Venezuela, Trinidad, Guyana, Surinam, Paraguay, and parts of Brazil.

References

gibba
Turtles of South America
Reptiles of Brazil
Reptiles of Colombia
Reptiles of Ecuador
Reptiles of French Guiana
Reptiles of Guyana
Reptiles of Paraguay
Reptiles of Peru
Reptiles of Suriname
Reptiles of Trinidad and Tobago
Reptiles of Venezuela
Reptiles described in 1812